The 2003–04 Midland Football Alliance season was the tenth in the history of Midland Football Alliance, a football competition in England.

Clubs and league table
The league featured 19 clubs from the previous season, along with five new clubs:
Alvechurch, promoted from the Midland Football Combination
Coalville Town, promoted from the Leicestershire Senior League
Racing Club Warwick, relegated from the Southern Football League
Rocester, relegated from the Southern Football League
Westfields, promoted from the West Midlands (Regional) League

League table

References

External links
 Midland Football Alliance

2003–04
8